Le Train Bleu ("The Blue Train") is a restaurant located in the hall of the Gare de Lyon railway station in Paris, France. It was designated a Monument Historique in 1972.

The restaurant was originally created for the Exposition Universelle (1900). Each ornate dining room is themed to represent cities and regions of France and they are decorated with 41 paintings by some of the most popular artists of that time.

Initially called "Buffet de la Gare de Lyon", it was renamed "Le Train Bleu" in 1963, after the famous train of the same name.

Artists who decorated Le Train Bleu

 Charles Bertier
 Eugène Burnand
 Eugène Dauphin
 Guillaume Dubufe
 François Flameng
 Henri Gervex
 Gaston La Touche
 Max Leenhardt
 Albert Maignan
 Frédéric Montenard
 Jean-Baptiste Olive
 Edmond Marie Petitjean
 Albert Rigolot
 Édouard Rosset-Granger
 Paul Saïn
 Gaston Casimir Saint-Pierre

Le Train Bleu in films
The restaurant has appeared in several films, including:
 1972: Travels with My Aunt, directed by George Cukor
 1973 The Mother and the Whore, directed by Jean Eustache
 1990: La Femme Nikita, directed by Luc Besson
 1998: Place Vendôme, directed by Nicole Garcia
 2003: Filles uniques, directed by Pierre Jolivet
 2007: Mr. Bean's Holiday, directed by Steve Bendelack
 2009: Micmacs, directed by Jean-Pierre Jeunet

External links

Official website

Restaurants in Paris
Buildings and structures in the 12th arrondissement of Paris
1901 establishments in France
Rail catering